Vikram Krishna Reddy, credited in films as Ajay, is an Indian film producer and former actor in Tamil cinema. He is the elder brother of noted actor Vishal and is married to actress Sriya Reddy. He produced films under the banner G.K Film Corporation.

Early life and career
His younger brother Vishal is a popular actor in Tamil film industry.

Vikram prepared to make a debut as an actor in Tamil films as early as January 1996.

Personal life
He is married to VJ-turned-actress Sriya Reddy. The couple has a daughter.

Filmography

As actor

As producer

Distribution

References 

Living people
Telugu people
Indian male film actors
Tamil male actors
Male actors in Tamil cinema
Tamil film producers
Year of birth missing (living people)